Zaccheus Malik Moss (born December 15, 1997) is an American football running back for the Indianapolis Colts of the National Football League (NFL). He played college football at Utah and was drafted by the Buffalo Bills in the third round of the 2020 NFL Draft.

Early years
Moss attended Mater Academy Charter School in Hialeah Gardens, Florida before transferring to Hallandale High School in Hallandale Beach, Florida for his senior year. As a senior, he played alongside future college teammate Tyler Huntley and he ran for 1,098 yards on 145 carries with 17 touchdowns. He originally committed to the University of Miami to play college football but changed to the University of Utah.

College career
As a freshman at Utah in 2016, Moss played in 10 games with three starts and rushed for 382 yards and two touchdowns on 84 carries. As a sophomore in 2017, he started 12 of 13 games, rushing for 1,173 yards on 214 carries with 10 touchdowns. As a junior in 2018, Moss started the first nine games of the season before suffering a season-ending knee during practice.

Moss returned for his senior year in 2019 after healing from last season's injury. He started 11 of 12 regular season games his senior year. In the regular season he rushed for 1,246 yards, 15 touchdowns, and averaged 6.2 yards per rush. With that effort he became the first 3-time 1,000 yard rusher in school history. During a week 7 game against Arizona State, Moss became the all-time leading rusher at the University of Utah. Moss and the Utes clinched their second Pac-12 south title on November 30, 2019, and played in the Pac-12 championship game against Oregon University on Friday, December 6, 2019. The Utes played against the Texas Longhorns in the Alamo Bowl on December 31, 2019, but lost 38–10. In the bowl game, Moss had 16 carries for 57 rushing yards and two receptions for 14 receiving yards.

Moss was the Pac-12 Offensive Player of the Year in his senior year. He finished his college career with 4,067 rushing yards and 38 rushing touchdowns, both Utah school records, in addition to 688 career receiving yards and three touchdown receptions.

Professional career

Buffalo Bills
The Buffalo Bills selected Moss in the third round with the 86th overall pick in the 2020 NFL Draft.

2020 season

Moss signed a four-year, $4.522 million contract with the Bills on June 15, 2020. In his NFL debut in Week 1 of the 2020 season against the New York Jets, Moss scored a four-yard receiving touchdown from quarterback Josh Allen. In Week 8 against the New England Patriots, he had 14 carries for 81 rushing yards and two rushing touchdowns in the 24–21 victory. Splitting carries with Devin Singletary throughout the season, Moss finished with the second most rushing yards on the team, with 481 yards and four touchdowns on 112 carries. In addition, he caught 14 passes for 95 yards and a touchdown.

Moss made his NFL playoff debut in the wild card round against the Indianapolis Colts. He rushed for 21 yards and caught four passes for 26 yards before suffering an ankle injury and being carted off. On January 12, 2021, Moss was placed on injured reserve due to the injury.

2021 season

Moss was a healthy scratch for the Bills in week 1 against the Pittsburgh Steelers, as the team opted to play Matt Breida in his stead. The following week against the Miami Dolphins, Moss made his season debut one day after attending his aunt's funeral. Despite fumbling early in the game, Moss finished the game with two touchdowns scored along with 26 rush yards on eight carries, in addition to 2 passes caught for 8 yards, as the Bills won 35–0. On his second touchdown, he collided with Miami linebacker Elandon Roberts before regaining his composure and powering into the endzone.

In week 3 against the Washington Football Team, Moss finished as Buffalo's leading rusher, finishing with 60 yards on 13 carries in a 43–21 win. He also caught 3 passes for 31 yards and a touchdown.

Indianapolis Colts
On November 1, 2022, the Bills traded Moss along with a conditional sixth round pick in the 2023 NFL Draft to the Indianapolis Colts for running back Nyheim Hines. Due to an injury to starter Jonathan Taylor, Moss became the Colts' primary running back starting with the team's game against the Los Angeles Chargers.

Personal life
Moss is the cousin of former NFL wide receivers Santana Moss and Sinorice Moss,  and a second cousin of Minnesota Vikings cornerback Patrick Peterson.

References

External links

Buffalo Bills bio
Utah Utes bio

1997 births
Living people
American football running backs
Buffalo Bills players
Moss, Zack
Indianapolis Colts players
Players of American football from Florida
Sportspeople from Miami-Dade County, Florida
Utah Utes football players